"Where It All Begins" is Lalah Hathaway's sixth studio album released on Stax Records and Concord Music Group on October 18, 2011.

It includes a remake of the song "I'm Coming Back" (with Rachelle Ferrell). The song was originally recorded by Vesta Williams for her 1986 album Vesta. The album also includes a cover of her late father Donny Hathaway's 1978 single "You Were Meant for Me". She also pays homage to Donny in the cover art.

Track listing

Charts

References

2011 albums
Lalah Hathaway albums